Ensign Washer or Ensign Thos (Thomas) Washer was an early Virginia colonist who settled in the area that became Isle of Wight County, Virginia. Washer and Christopher Lawne represented Lawne's Plantation as burgesses in the first assembly of the Virginia House of Burgesses, the lower house of the colonial Virginia General Assembly, in 1619.

"Ensign" is a military grade or rank, not the colonist's first name, and there is some suggestion that he was a lower ranking military officer before he arrived in Virginia. He also would have been a member of the local militia after his arrival in Virginia. Sources seem to be uniform in their identification of Washer as "Ensign" and only one source has been found which states that his name was "Thos" (Thomas). Even if this is true and can be verified, the colonist is shown as Ensign Washer here because that is how he is shown in sources which identify him as a member of the first session of the House of Burgesses.

Before 1619, Ensign Washer, Captain Nathaniel Basse and Giles Jones received patents for land along the Pagan River.  Captain Christopher Lawne then settled near the mouth of Lawne's Creek in the same vicinity. Although the area was known as Lawne's Plantation and its representatives were listed as representatives from the plantation, the colonists also had named the area "Warresqueak County" after the Native American tribe who lived there. Washer and Christopher Lawne represented Lawne's Plantation in the first assembly of the Virginia House of Burgesses in 1619. In 1620, a movement began to change the name of "Warresqueak County" to "Isle of Wight County" but this was not done until 1637.

The Daughters of the American Revolution state that Ensign Washer had a daughter named Margaret (Polly). Little if anything more is known about Ensign Washer or what may have become of him. Records do not show him as among the dead of the Indian massacre of 1622 nor do they list him in the muster of 1624. Yet his name survives as a member of the first representative assembly in the areas that would become both the State of Virginia and the United States of America.

See also
 List of members of the Virginia House of Burgesses

Notes

References
 Boddie, John Bennett. Colonial Surry. Richmond: Dietz Press, 1948. . Retrieved July 20, 2011.
 Boddie, John Bennett. Seventeenth century Isle of Wight County, Virginia: a history of the county of Isle of Wight, Virginia, during the seventeenth century, including abstracts of the county records. Chicago, Chicago Law Print. Co. 1938. . Retrieved July 20, 2011.
 Daughters of the American Revolution. National historical magazine, Volume 71. Published by National Society of the Daughters of the American Revolution, 1937.  Retrieved July 21, 2011.
 Henings, Statutes at Large, shown as Virginia, William Waller Hening, Virginia (Colony). The statutes at large: being a collection of all the laws of Virginia. Volume 1, Richmond, VA: Printed by and for Samuel Pleasants, Junior, printer to the Commonwealth, 1809-1823. . Retrieved July 15, 2011.
 Henry, William Wirt. The First Legislative Assembly in America. In Annual Report of the American Historical Association for the Year 1893. Washington, Government Printing Office, 1894. . Retrieved July 21, 2011.
 McCartney, Martha W. Virginia immigrants and adventurers, 1607-1635: a biographical dictionary. Baltimore: Genealogical Pub. Co., 2007. .
 Stanard, William G. and Mary Newton Stanard. The Virginia Colonial Register. Albany, NY: Joel Munsell's Sons Publishers, 1902. , Retrieved July 15, 2011.
 Tyler, Lyon Gardiner in Encyclopedia of Virginia biography. New York: Lewis Historical Pub. Co., 1915. . Retrieved July 21, 2011. 

Year of birth unknown
Year of death unknown
House of Burgesses members
Virginia colonial people
English emigrants
People from Isle of Wight County, Virginia
American planters